INS Mangrol was an Indian Naval minesweeper, named after a port in the coast of Gujarat called Mangrol. She remained in service until decommissioned at Naval Base, Kochi on 5 January 2003.

Service

References

Mahé-class minesweepers